Inseguendo l'aquila is the seventh studio album released by Mango, in 1988.

The album also was released in Spain under the name Hierro y fuego.

Mango's future wife Laura Valente did back-up vocals on the record.

Track listing

Inseguendo l'aquila

Hierro y fuego
 "Hierro y fuego" 
 "Hallandote... Buscandome" 
 "Oasis" 
 "Mare en calma"
 "En La Penumbra... Yo Pense" 
 "Madre" 
 "Persiguiendo Al Aguila" 
 "Las Mentiras De Los Angeles"
 "Se Esconde En Ti"

Personnel
Mango - lead vocals, choir, keyboards
Rocco Petruzzi - keyboards
Graziano Accinni - guitar
Lele Melotti - drums
Steve Ferrera - drums
Paolo Costa - bass
Max Costa - computer programming
Laura Valente - choir

References 

Mango albums
1988 albums